St Anne's Church, Wandsworth, is a Grade II* listed church on St Ann's Hill, Wandsworth, London.

History
A Commissioners' church, it was built from 1820 to 1824. It was designed by the architect Robert Smirke in Greek Revival style. Smirke also used the tower design for St Mary's, Bryanston Square and St Philip's Church, Salford, although these two churches have semicircular porticos unlike that of St Anne's.

Notable people
 Bertram Cunningham, later Principal of Westcott House, Cambridge, served his curacy here in the 1890s
 James Booth, minister from 1854

References

External links
St. Anne's Church Wandsworth website

Churches completed in 1824
Commissioners' church buildings
Wandsworth
Grade II* listed buildings in the London Borough of Wandsworth
Wandsworth
Wandsworth
19th-century Church of England church buildings